The Golden Calf Development Prize is awarded at the Netherlands Film Festival.

 2007 Berend Boorsma, Roel Boorsma and San Fu Maltha - Milo
 2005 Reinier Selen, Edwin van Meurs and Melinda Jansen - White Women
 2004 Maria Uitdehaag, Jacqueline de Goeij and Ruud van der Heyde - Pol & Lot
 2003 Ineke Houtman, Jan van der Zanden and Wilant Boekelman - When Night Falls
 2002 Eugenie Jansen and Stienette Bosklopper - Calimucho

References

External links
 NFF Website

Development Prize